Shakhboz Furkatovich Erkinov (born 16 July 1986) is a Russian-Uzbekistani football player. He plays for the Uzbekistan Pro League club FK Andijon as a forward.

Career
He started playing career at Sogdiana Jizzakh in 2005. In 2006, he moved to Sho'rtanneftgaz G'uzor. From 2008 to 2009 he played for PAS Hamedan in Iran Pro League. He reached semi-final of Hazfi Cup in 2009 with his club and lost by 0:1 to Rah Ahan Sorinet. After playing two seasons for PAS Hamedan he joined Shurtan Guzar. In 2009 season he scored 9 goals and became the best club goal scorer in League matches. He scored also 9 goals in the next season and became 2nd best goalscorer after Igor Taran with 10 goals.

In 2014, he moved to Navbahor Namangan. He became one of the league top scorers with 14 goals and one of the three players made hat-trick in 2014 League season. Erkinov completed two hat-tricks in the season. On 26 April 2014 he made first hat-trick of 2014 League season in match Navbahor – Sogdiana Jizzakh ended with score 4:2. On 12 September 2014 in an away match against Sogdiana ended with 5:4 victory of Sogdiana side, he scored another three goals. As of end of the 2014 season Erkinov scored 14 goals in League, only 4 less than League scorer Artur Gevorkyan. In 2014 Uzbek Cup matches he also scored 3 goals for the club.

On 16 May 2015 Erkinov scored a spectacular Comeback goal in a League away match against FK Andijan. After Predrag Vujović goal for Andijan on 76-minute with 2:1 leading, Navbahor players were to start the game from pitch centre. Erkinov received ball and noticed that Andijans's goalkeeper Ghenadie Moșneaga was standing a long way out of his goal, and hit a shot from the halfway line over the goalkeeper and ball floated into the net. His this goal was scored on 77 minutes with 2:2.

In 2015 season Erkinov again became the club's best goalscorer in League with 13 goals.

International career
Shakhboz Erkinov was a member of Uzbekistan national under-20 football team at the 2004 AFC Youth Championship. He was also with Uzbekistan national under-23 football team, competing in the qualification games for the 2008 Summer Olympics.

He made his debut for senior team on 28 January 2009 against UAE national football team at a qualification game for 2011 Asian Cup.

Honours

Club
Shurtan Guzar
 Uzbek Cup runner-up: 2010

Individual
 Navbahor's Top Scorer in League (2): 2014, 2015

Career statistics

 Assist Goals

References

External links

1986 births
Living people
Uzbekistani footballers
Uzbekistani expatriate footballers
Uzbekistan international footballers
Sportspeople from Tashkent
Association football forwards
Pakhtakor Tashkent FK players
FC Sogdiana Jizzakh players
FC Shurtan Guzar players
Pas players
FC AGMK players
Navbahor Namangan players
FK Mash'al Mubarek players
FC Nasaf players
PFK Nurafshon players
FC Bunyodkor players
FK Andijon players
Uzbekistan Super League players
Uzbekistani expatriate sportspeople in Iran
Expatriate footballers in Iran